Road signs in the Philippines are regulated and standardized by the Department of Public Works and Highways (DPWH). Most of the signs reflect minor influences from US and Australian signs but keep a design closer to the Vienna Convention on Road Signs and Signals in which the Philippines is an original signatory.

It is unclear if the DPWH mandates the use of, or has a preference between, Clearview and Highway Gothic as the official typefaces for signs but most road signs do use them.

Regulatory signs 
Regulatory signs indicate the application of legal or statutory requirements. Disregarding these signs may constitute the road user to an offense.

Priority signs

Direction signs

Restrictive signs

Speed signs

Parking signs

Miscellaneous signs

Warning signs 
Warning signs are used to warn road users to the potential hazard along, or adjacent to, the road.

Horizontal alignment signs

Intersection and junction signs

Advance warning of traffic control devices signs

Road width signs

Road obstacle signs

Pedestrian signs

Railroad crossing signs

Supplementary signs

Other warning road signs

Guide or information signs 
Guide or information signs are used to inform road users about the direction and distances of the route that they are following.

Advance direction signs

Intersection direction signs

Reassurance direction signs

Finger board and direction signs for less important roads

Street signs

Town names and geographical feature signs

Service signs

Tourist information and tourist destination signs

Route marker signs

Asian highway route marker signs

Expressway signs 
Expressway signs are signs that are used on, or near, controlled-access roads.

Expressway approach signs

Expressway information signs

Advance exit signs

Exit direction signs

Expressway service signs

End of expressway signs

Toll signs

Expressway traffic instruction and regulatory signs

Traffic instruction signs 
Traffic instruction signs are used to instruct a road user to follow a direction or perform an action. These are also used as a supplement for regulatory and warning signs.

Supplementary signs

Movement instruction signs

Hazard markers 
Hazard markers are signs that are usually used in places with obstructions and curves. These signs may be used with or after a warning sign.

Sources

Notes

References

External links 
 A quick guide to safe driving by recognizing standard road signs in the Philippines by the Manila Bulletin

Signs
Philippines

fi:Luettelo Filippiinien liikennemerkeistä
sv:Vägmärken i Filippinerna